The fourth and final season of The Unit started on September 28, 2008, and concluded on May 10, 2009. The season included 22 episodes and introduced Bridget Sullivan (Nicole Steinwedell) and Sam McBride (Wes Chatham), new members to the unit and the team.

It was announced on May 19, 2009, that CBS declined to renew the series for a fifth season, along with Without a Trace.

For the 2008-09 U.S. television season, the fourth season of The Unit ranked #43 with an average of 10 million viewers.

Cast and characters

Main cast 
 Dennis Haysbert as Sergeant Major Jonas Blane,  Snake Doctor
 Scott Foley as Sergeant First Class Bob Brown, a.k.a. Cool Breeze
 Max Martini as Master Sergeant Mack Gerhardt, a.k.a. Dirt Diver
 Michael Irby as Sergeant First Class Charles Grey, a.k.a. Betty Blue
 Robert Patrick as Colonel Thomas Ryan, a.k.a. Dog Patch
 Nicole Steinwedell as Warrant Officer One Bridget Sullivan, a.k.a. Red Cap

Supporting cast 
 Wes Chatham as Staff Sergeant Sam McBride, a.k.a. Whiplash
 Regina Taylor as Molly Blane
 Audrey Marie Anderson as Kim Brown
 Abby Brammell as Tiffy Gerhardt
 Bre Blair as Joss Grey
 Rebecca Pidgeon as Charlotte Ryan
 Kavita Patil as Sergeant Kayla Medawar

Recurring cast 
 Susan Matus as Sergeant Sarah Irvine
 Angel Wainwright as Second Lieutenant Betsy Blane
 Alyssa Shafer as Serena Brown

Episodes

References

External links

Notes 

2008 American television seasons
2009 American television seasons
The Unit seasons